Justice Dickerson may refer to:

Jonathan G. Dickerson (1811–1878), associate justice of the Maine Supreme Judicial Court
Mahlon Dickerson (1770–1853), associate justice of the New Jersey Supreme Court

See also
Justice Dickinson (disambiguation)